Diamandi Gheciu (20 April 1892 in Bucharest – 1 October 1982, Bucharest) was a Romanian composer.

Selected works, editions and recordings
Gheciu: "Si daca", on Angela Gheorghiu with Jeff Cohen (pianist) - Live from La Scala - song recital EMI 2007

References

1892 births
1982 deaths
20th-century classical composers
Romanian classical composers
Male classical composers
20th-century male musicians